Sphecosoma mathani is a moth in the subfamily Arctiinae. It was described by Rothschild in 1911. It is found in the Amazon region.

References

Natural History Museum Lepidoptera generic names catalog

Moths described in 1911
Sphecosoma